The cabinet of Yemeni prime minister Ali Mohammed Mujawar took the constitutional oath before president Ali Abdullah Saleh on 7 April 2007. The cabinet was made up of 33 ministers.

List of ministers

See also 

 Politics of Yemen

References 

Cabinets of Yemen
2007 establishments in Yemen
Mujawar Cabinet